Ricardinho may refer to:

Sportspeople

Football
Ricardinho (footballer, born 1975), born Ricardo Souza Silva, Brazilian football attacking midfielder
Ricardinho (footballer, born May 1976), born Ricardo Luis Pozzi Rodrigues, Brazilian football manager and former footballer
Ricardinho (footballer, born June 1976), born Ricardo Alexandre dos Santos, Brazilian football defensive midfielder
Ricardinho (footballer, born 1978), born Cicero Ricardo de Souza, Brazilian football forward
Ricardinho (footballer, born 1979), born Ricardo Modesto da Silva, Brazilian football forward
Ricardinho (footballer, born January 1982), born Ricardo Andrade Alves, Brazilian football forward
Ricardinho (footballer, born November 1982), born Ricardo Alves Fernandes, Brazilian football midfielder
Ricardinho (footballer, born 1983), born Ricardo Weslei de Campelo, Brazilian football forward
Ricardinho (footballer, born May 1984), born José Ricardo dos Santos Oliveira, Brazilian football striker
Ricardinho (footballer, born September 1984), born Ricardo Ferreira da Silva Kubitski, Brazilian football left-back
Ricardinho (footballer, born 1985), born Ricardo Dias Acosta, Brazilian football midfielder
Ricardinho (footballer, born May 1986), born Ricardo Martins Pereira, Equatoguinean football striker
Ricardinho Paraiba (born 1986), born Ricardo Ferreira da Silva, Brazilian football forward
Ricardinho (footballer, born 1988), born Ricardo Alves Pereira, Brazilian football striker
Ricardinho (footballer, born March 1989), born Ricardo Ribeiro de Lima, Brazilian football defensive midfielder
Ricardinho (footballer, born June 1989), born Ricardo Silva de Almeida, Brazilian football midfielder
Ricardinho (footballer, born September 1989), born Ricardo Cavalcante Mendes, Brazilian football striker
Ricardinho (footballer, born 1994), born Ricardo José Veiga Varzim Miranda, Portuguese football right-back
Ricardinho Costa (born 1994), born Ricardo Mendes Costa, Portuguese football midfielder
Ricardinho (footballer, born 1998), born Ricardo Jorge Oliveira António, Portuguese football midfielder
Ricardinho (freestyle football) (born 1998), born Ricardo Fabiano Chahini de Araujo, Brazilian freestyle footballer
Ricardinho (footballer, born 2001), Ricardo Viana Filho
Ricardinho (footballer, born 2005), born Ricardo Alexandre Gomes Simões, Portuguese footballer

Futsal
Ricardinho (futsal player, born 1985), born Ricardo Filipe da Silva Braga, Portuguese futsal winger
Ricardinho (futsal player, born 1991), born Ricardo Alberto de Jesus Pinto, Portuguese futsal universal

Jiu-jitsu
Ricardinho (jiu-jitsu), born Ricardo Alcantara Vieira, Brazilian jiu-jitsu fighter

Volleyball
Ricardinho (volleyball) (born 1975), born Ricardo Bermudez Garcia, Brazilian volleyball player

See also

Ricardo (disambiguation)